Yu (Chinese surname) (Chinese: 余)
Yee (surname) (simp. 叶, trad. 葉) -- variants Yee, Yeh, Yip/Ip, Yap, Yapp

Notable people with surname Yee (余) 
Persons with surname "Yee"(余) include:
Charmaine Yee (born 1987), Singaporean emcee and radio announcer
James Yee (born 1968), US Army Chaplain
Kelvin Han Yee (born 1961), American Actor

Notable people with surname Yee (爾)
Persons with surname "Yee"(爾) include:
Derek Yee (born 1957), film director and screenwriter

Notable people with surname Yee 

Angela Yee, American radio personality 
Becky Yee (born 1969), American portrait photographer
Betty Yee, California Comptroller
David Yee, Canadian actor and playwright
Harry Yee (1918-2022), American bartender
Jennifer Yee, American chef
Jimmie R. Yee (born 1934), American politician
Kelvin Han Yee, American actor
Kimberly Yee (born 1974), American politician
Leland Yee (born 1948), American politician
Lisa Yee, Chinese American writer
Mark Yee (born 1982), Filipino basketball player
Mary Yee (née Ygnacio, 1897–1965), the last first-language speaker of the Barbareño language
Nick Yee, American researcher of social interaction in virtual environments
Paul Yee (born 1956), Chinese-Canadian historian and writer
Richard Yee, Filipino basketball player
Rodney Yee, American yoga instructor
Yee Chung-Man, Chinese production designer, art director, costume designer and film director
Yee Jee Tso (born 1975), Canadian actor